Born in Watertown, New York, on March 28, 1938, Arthur E. Williams obtained a commission as an Army engineer officer upon his graduation in 1960 from Saint Lawrence University, where he majored in mathematics. At St. Lawrence he was a member of Phi Sigma Kappa fraternity.  He later obtained a bachelor's degree in civil engineering from Rensselaer Polytechnic Institute and a master's degree in civil engineering and economic planning from Stanford University.

Williams commanded an armored engineer company in West Germany and an engineer construction company in South Vietnam. During a second tour in South Vietnam, he served as Operations Officer of the 577th Engineer Battalion. He later commanded the 44th Engineer Battalion in South Korea and was an assignment officer at the Army Military Personnel Center. Williams headed the Corps' Sacramento District in 1982-85 and then served as Chief of Staff at Corps Headquarters. He subsequently headed the Pacific Ocean Division and then the Lower Mississippi Valley Division. He was also President of the Mississippi River Commission. He returned to Corps Headquarters in July 1991 as Director of Civil Works. President Bush appointed Williams Chief of Engineers in 1992.

After retiring from the Army, he joined Dawson & Associates in Washington, DC as a federal permitting advisor.

Military awards
  Legion of Merit with two Oak Leaf Clusters
  Bronze Star  with Oak Leaf Cluster
  Defense Meritorious Service Medal

See also

References
This article contains public domain text from

External links

1938 births
Living people
People from Watertown, New York
United States Army generals
Recipients of the Legion of Merit
United States Army personnel of the Vietnam War
Rensselaer Polytechnic Institute alumni
United States Army Corps of Engineers personnel